Micael Lundmark (born 27 September 1986) is a Swedish snowboarder. He competed in the men's halfpipe event at the 2006 Winter Olympics.

References

External links
 

1986 births
Living people
Swedish male snowboarders
Olympic snowboarders of Sweden
Snowboarders at the 2006 Winter Olympics
People from Skellefteå Municipality
Sportspeople from Västerbotten County
21st-century Swedish people